The 2009–10 Australian Figure Skating Championships was held in Penrith and Canterbury from 15 through 22 August 2009. Skaters competed in the disciplines of men's singles, ladies' singles, ice dancing, and synchronized skating across many levels, including senior, junior, novice, adult, and the pre-novice disciplines of primary and intermediate.

Skaters from New Zealand and Japan competed as guest skaters and their results were discounted from the final results.

Senior results

Men

Ladies

Ice dancing

Synchronized

Junior results

Men

Ladies

Ice dancing

Synchronized

Novice results

Boys

Girls

Ice dancing

Synchronized

External links
 2009 Australian Figure Skating Championships results

2009 in figure skating
2010 in figure skating
Figure Skating Championships 2009-10
Figure Skating Championships 2009-10
2009